John Adam Fleming,  (January 28, 1877 – July 29, 1956) was an American geophysicist interested in the magnetosphere and the atmospheric electricity.
Fleming worked first at the U.S. Coast and Geodetic Survey with his superior Louis Agricola Bauer, who founded the Department of Terrestrial Magnetism at the Carnegie Institution of Washington. He steadily advanced in the hierarchy of the institute and became its director in 1935. In 1925, Fleming served as president of the Philosophical Society of Washington. Fleming was elected into the National Academy of Sciences in 1940.

John Adam Fleming Medal
Since 1960 the American Geophysical Union rewards notable scientists in the field of research about the magnetosphere and  atmospheric electricity.

References

1877 births
1956 deaths
Members of the United States National Academy of Sciences
American physicists